The 1986 Cal State Fullerton Titans football team represented California State University, Fullerton as a member of the Pacific Coast Athletic Association (PCAA) during the 1986 NCAA Division I-A football season. Led by seventh-year head coach Gene Murphy, Cal State Fullerton compiled an overall record of 3–9 with a mark of 2–5 in conference play, tying for sixth place in the PCAA. The Titans played their home games at Santa Ana Stadium in Santa Ana, California.

Schedule

Team players in the NFL
The following Cal State Fullerton Titans were selected in the 1987 NFL Draft.

The following finished their college career in 1986, were not drafted, but played in the NFL.

References

Cal State Fullerton
Cal State Fullerton Titans football seasons
Cal State Fullerton Titans football